Sonoma may refer to:

 Sonoma (beetle), a genus of beetles
 Sonoma County, California, a county in northern California in the United States
 Sonoma, California, the city for which the county is named
 Sonoma Valley, the region in Sonoma County in which Sonoma is the largest settlement and only incorporated city
 Sonoma State University, in Rohnert Park, Sonoma County, California
 , various United States Navy ships
 GMC Sonoma, a model of pickup truck
 Sonoma, the code name for an Intel Centrino platform (see Centrino#Sonoma platform)
 Sonoma Mountains, in Sonoma County, California
 Sonoma Raceway, a motor racing course and dragstrip in the Sonoma Mountains
 Sonoma Range, mountain range in Nevada
 Sonoma Peak, mountain peak in Nevada, the highest mountain in the above range
 Sonoma Adventist College, a college in Papua New Guinea

See also
Sonora (disambiguation)